Marco Scandella (born February 23, 1990) is a Canadian professional ice hockey defenceman for the St. Louis Blues of the National Hockey League (NHL). He previously played major junior hockey in the Quebec Major Junior Hockey League (QMJHL) for the Val d'Or Foreurs prior to being selected by the Minnesota Wild in the second-round, 55th overall, in the 2008 NHL Entry Draft. As well as the Wild, Scandella formerly played with the Buffalo Sabres and Montreal Canadiens.

Playing career

Amateur
Scandella began his junior career with the Val d'Or Foreurs of the QMJHL. Shortly after returning from the 2010 World Junior Championships tournament, Scandella was suspended for 15 games by the QMJHL for elbowing Alexandre Durette of the Rimouski Océanic in the head.

Professional

Minnesota Wild
Scandella made his NHL debut for the Minnesota Wild on November 12, 2010, against the Florida Panthers.  He scored his first career NHL goal during the first game of the 2011–12 season against Steve Mason of the Columbus Blue Jackets.

Scandella began his breakout year in the 2013–14 season, skating in 76 games with the Wild and playing the majority of his minutes on the second defensive pairing with close friend Jared Spurgeon. He scored three goals and added 14 assists for 17 points over the course of the season.

There were high expectations for Scandella entering the 2014–15 season. He immediately made an impact, going on a scoring streak and surpassing his career totals of goals scored. He scored the overtime winners against the Winnipeg Jets and Dallas Stars on November 14 and November 29, and on the latter date signed a five-year, $20 million contract extension with Minnesota. Scandella was later fined $2,755.38 for an illegal check to the head of the St. Louis Blues' T. J. Oshie on December 1, and nine days later, he was suspended a further two games for the same infraction against the New York Islanders' Brock Nelson.

Buffalo Sabres
After seven seasons with Minnesota, Scandella (alongside Jason Pominville and a 2018 fourth-round pick) was traded to the Buffalo Sabres on June 30, 2017 in exchange for Tyler Ennis, Marcus Foligno and a third-round pick.

Montreal Canadiens
Entering the final year of his contract in the 2019–20 season, Scandella contributed with three goals and nine points in 31 games. On January 3, 2020, Scandella was traded to the Montreal Canadiens in exchange for a 2020 fourth-round pick. He scored his first goal for the Canadiens on February 8 in a 2–1 overtime win against the Toronto Maple Leafs.

St. Louis Blues
On February 18, 2020, Scandella, after only one month with the Canadiens, was traded on to the St. Louis Blues in exchange for a 2020 second-round pick and 2021 conditional fourth-round pick. Scandella made 11 regular season appearances with the Blues, registering 1 assist, before the season was suspended due to the coronavirus pandemic.

On April 16, 2020, the Blues signed Scandella as an impending free agent to a four-year, $13.1 million contract extension.

International play

Scandella represented Canada internationally for the first time at the 2008 World Under-18 Championships, helping his country to a gold medal and recording one goal and one assist in seven games. He also represented Canada at the 2010 World Junior Championships, helping the team to a silver medal and recording one goal and two assists in six games.

Personal life
Scandella is the nephew of former NHLer Sergio Momesso. Marco's older brother, Giulio Scandella, plays professional hockey in Italy and is a member of the Italian national team with whom he appeared at the 2006 Winter Olympics. Scandella's father, Francesco, is an Italian immigrant, and Marco is trilingual, speaking English, French and Italian.

Career statistics

Regular season and playoffs

International

References

External links
 

1990 births
Living people
Anglophone Quebec people
Buffalo Sabres players
Canadian ice hockey defencemen
Canadian people of Italian descent
French Quebecers
Houston Aeros (1994–2013) players
Minnesota Wild draft picks
Minnesota Wild players
Montreal Canadiens players
Ice hockey people from Montreal
St. Louis Blues players
Val-d'Or Foreurs players